This is a list of notable members of Peterhouse, a college of the University of Cambridge, England. It includes alumni, fellows and Masters of the college.

Alumni

Public servants 

 Elizabeth Butler-Sloss, Baroness Butler-Sloss - First female Lord Justice of Appeal, 1988–1999, President of the Family Division, High Court of Justice, 1999–2005
 The Duke of Grafton, Prime Minister of Great Britain, 1768-1770
 Elijah Mudenda, Prime Minister of Zambia, 1975-1977
 Michael Howard, Leader of the Conservative Party, 2003-2005
 Christopher Meyer, British Ambassador to the United States, 1997-2003
 Michael Portillo, Cabinet Minister, 1992-1997
 Nicholas Stern, author of the Stern Review on climate change
 Conrad Swan, Garter Principal King of Arms
 John Whitgift, Archbishop of Canterbury, 1583-1604
 David Wilson, Governor of Hong Kong, 1987-1992

Academics, artists, writers 

 Kingsley Amis, writer
 Richard Baker (broadcaster), broadcaster
 Denis Brogan, historian
 Herbert Butterfield, historian, Master of Peterhouse, 1955–1968, Vice-Chancellor of the University of Cambridge, 1959–1961, and Regius Professor of Modern History, 1963-1968
 Thomas Campion, 16th century composer
 John Ashton Cannon, historian
 Alistair Cooke, Baron Lexden, official historian of the Conservative Party
 Patrick Cosgrave, journalist, author and advisor to Margaret Thatcher
 Maurice Cowling, historian
 Mike Dash, historian
 Marius De Vries, composer and producer, best known as music director of La La Land
 Roger Deakin, naturalist writer
 Robert Dudley Edwards, historian
 Ronan Fanning, historian
 John Finnemore, writer and actor
 Michael Gough, archaeologist
 Thomas Gray, poet
 Colin Greenwood, Radiohead bassist
 Luke Hughes, furniture designer
 Harold James, historian
 David Knowles, Regius Professor of Modern History, 1954–1963
 Denis Mack Smith, historian
 F.X. Martin, historian and first Catholic priest admitted to Cambridge since the Reformation
 James Mason, actor
 Sam Mendes, Academy Award-winning film director (for American Beauty) and four-time Laurence Olivier Award winner
 David Mitchell, actor, comedian and writer
 A. L. Morton, Marxist historian
 Michael Postan, historian
 William Ridgeway, classical scholar and Disney Professor of Archaeology, Cambridge University
 Arthur M. Schlesinger Jr., American political historian. 
 Karl Schweizer, historian and author.

Scientists and inventors 

 Nick Barton, evolutionary biologist
 Christopher Cockerell, inventor of the hovercraft
 Peter Guthrie Tait, mathematician
 William Hopkins, mathematician
 Joseph E. Pesce, astrophysicist
 Edward John Routh, mathematician
 Klaus Roth, mathematician and winner of the Fields Medal

Fellows

Masters
For a list see Master of Peterhouse, Cambridge.

References

Peterhouse, Cambridge
Peterhouse